Faryab or Fariab or Fareyab or Fariyab may refer to the following places in Iran:
 Faryab, Iran, city in Kerman Province
 Faryab, Dashtestan, Bushehr Province
 Faryab, alternate name of Rud-e-Faryab, Bushehr Province
 Tang-e Fariab, Bushehr Province
 Faryab, Mohr, Fars Province
 Fariab, Rostam, Fars Province
 Faryab, Bastak, Hormozgan Province
 Faryab, Minab, Hormozgan Province
 Faryab, Rudan, Hormozgan Province
 Faryab, Rudkhaneh, Hormozgan Province
 Faryab-e Isin, Hormozgan Province
 Faryab-e Sanguyeh, Hormozgan Province
 Faryab, Khuzestan
 Fariab-e Kalamak, Kohgiluyeh and Boyer-Ahmad Province
 Faryab County, in Kerman Province
 Faryab Rural District, in Hormozgan Province